Suck My Pop is a British comedy music chat show presented by Kimberley Walsh (part of pop group Girls Aloud) and Will Best.  It is a weekly show which was broadcast on Fridays at 7pm, between August and September 2010, covering music and celebrity news. It also includes interviews and/or challenges with groups or singers.

The initial reception has been average however, there has been some controversy on Walsh's television presenting ability and Best not being recognisable as a presenter. In terms of viewing figures the first two episodes didn't reach the top ten programs for Viva.

References

External links
Suck My Pop - VIVA

2010s British music television series
2010 British television series debuts
2010 British television series endings